Batagarawa is a Local Government Area in Katsina State, Nigeria. Its headquarters are in the town of Batagarawa.

The institution of higher learning situated in Batagarawa LGA are:

Umaru Musa Yar'adua University, Katsina

Federal College of Education, KATSINA

Al-qalam University Katsina

History 
It is populated by Hausa people and the town is the capital of Mallamawa District in Katsina Emirate, North Western State. 
The LGA was established in 1991.

It has an area of 433 km and a population of 184,575 at the 2006 census.

The postal code of the area is 820.

Geography 
Wind speed in the area is estimated at 5 km/h while the humidity level is at 11 percent.

References 

Local Government Areas in Katsina State